Christian Peter Lübeck (born 23 April 1991) is a Danish sailor. He and Jonas Warrer placed fourth in the 49er event at the 2016 Summer Olympics.

References

External links
 
 
 

1991 births
Living people
Danish male sailors (sport)
Olympic sailors of Denmark
Sailors at the 2016 Summer Olympics – 49er
Sailors at the 2020 Summer Olympics – Nacra 17